In the run up to the 2023 Polish parliamentary election, various organisations carry out opinion polling to gauge voting intention in Poland. Results of such polls are displayed in this article. The date range for these opinion polls are from the 2019 Polish parliamentary election, held on 13 October, to the present day. The next general election is scheduled to be held not later than November 2023.

Graphical summary

Poll results 
Poll results are listed in the tables below in reverse chronological order, showing the most recent first, and using the date the survey's fieldwork was done, as opposed to the date of publication. If such date is unknown, the date of publication is given instead. The highest percentage figure in each polling survey is displayed in bold, and the background shaded in the leading party's colour. In the instance that there is a tie, then no figure is shaded. The lead column on the right shows the percentage-point difference between the two parties with the highest figures. When a specific poll does not show a data figure for a party, the party's cell corresponding to that poll is shown empty.

Parties are denoted with en dashes if no indication is given of their level in polls.

2023

2022

2021

2020

2019

Alternative scenarios

Parties

Seat projection

Alternative seat projections 
Following set of projections is the result of continuous simulations carried out by Election Research Team of University of Lodz. The simulations use models of the spatial distribution of votes for individual parties, based on historical data.

2021

Government approval ratings

President Andrzej Duda

Prime Minister Mateusz Morawiecki

Law and Justice government

Government actions regarding environmental disaster on Odra River

Government actions regarding Russian invasion of Ukraine

Government preparation and dealing with COVID-19 pandemic

Notes

References

External links 
 Parlamentarny.pl - List of all polls

Poland
2023